Haplochromis piceatus is a species of cichlid fish endemic to Lake Victoria in East Africa. Although listed as vulnerable by the IUCN, surveys since 2005 have failed to find it in its home lake and it is possibly extinct in the wild. Captive "safety populations" are maintained at several public aquariums.

Males are bluish-black with orange fins and females are grayish. The species generally resembles H. cinereus and H. macrops, also from Lake Victoria, but it differs in having a longer jaw and a higher gill raker count. In the wild it was typically found over a muddy bottom at depths of about  where it fed on zooplankton and insect larvae, but captives will eat a wide range of standard aquarium fish food.

References

piceatus
Fish described in 1969
Taxonomy articles created by Polbot